.google is a brand top-level domain (TLD) used in the Domain Name System (DNS) of the Internet. Created in 2014, it is operated by Alphabet Inc., Google's parent company. It is notable as one of the first gTLDs associated with a specific brand. The company's first usage of the TLD was with com.google, an April Fools' Day joke website that hosted a horizontally mirrored version of Google Search. The domain currently hosts multiple Alphabet Inc. products and services, and plans exist to move other Alphabet properties to .google as well.

References

External links
 IANA .google WHOIS info

Top-level domains
Computer-related introductions in 2014
Google